The 1977 NCAA Division III football season -- part of college football in the United States organized by the National Collegiate Athletic Association at the Division III level—began in August 1977, and concluded with the NCAA Division III Football Championship in December 1977 at Garrett-Harrison Stadium in Phenix City, Alabama. The Widener Pioneers won their first Division III championship, defeating the Wabash Little Giants by a final score of 39−36.

Conference standings

Conference champions

Postseason
The 1977 NCAA Division III Football Championship playoffs were the fifth annual single-elimination tournament to determine the national champion of men's NCAA Division III college football. The championship game was held at Garrett-Harrison Stadium in Phenix City, Alabama for the fifth consecutive year. Like the previous two championships, eight teams competed in this edition.

Playoff bracket

See also
1977 NCAA Division I football season
1977 NCAA Division II football season
1977 NAIA Division I football season
1977 NAIA Division II football season

References